Dowleh Danlu (also Romanized as Dowleh Dānlū, Dowladānlū, Dowladānlu, and Dūledānlū; also known as Dowlū) is a village in Jirestan Rural District, Sarhad District, Shirvan County, North Khorasan Province, Iran. At the 2006 census, its population was 39, in 6 families.

References 

Populated places in Shirvan County